Arkengarthdale Gunnerside and Reeth Moors ( and ) is a  biological Site of Special Scientific Interest (SSSI) in the Yorkshire Dales between Arkengarthdale and Swaledale. The SSSI was first notified in June 1998 and is due to the blanket bog, heather moorland, and breeding bird populations such as merlin and golden plover.

References
 

Sites of Special Scientific Interest in North Yorkshire
Sites of Special Scientific Interest notified in 1998
Swaledale
Moorlands of England
Arkengarthdale